Abu Tahir Shirazi was a Persian official, who served as the secretary (dabir) of the Samanid slave-general Tash. Abu Tahir belonged to a family native to Shiraz, hence his nisba “Shirazi”. He had a son named Ahmad Shirazi, who would later serve as the vizier of the Ghaznavid Empire.

Sources 
 

Year of death unknown
10th-century births
10th-century Iranian people
Samanid officials